A referendum on an early dissolution of Parliament was held in Egypt on 11 October 1990. The referendum followed the Supreme Constitutional Court ruling that the 1987 elections were unconstitutional as the 1986 electoral law discriminated against independent candidates. The court ruled that any legislation passed after 2 June 1990 would not be valid. In September, President Hosni Mubarak announced that a referendum would take place to decide whether Parliament should be dissolved early.

After its approval, early elections were held on 29 November. Voter turnout was 58.6%.

Results

References

1990 referendums
1990 in Egypt
Referendums in Egypt
October 1990 events in Africa